Mellouli v. Lynch, 575 U.S. 798 (2015) is a Supreme Court of the United States ruling which reversed the United States Court of Appeals for the Eighth Circuit on the matter of whether Tunisian national Moones Mellouli should be deported after being convicted for driving under the influence.

Background 
Mellouli was detained after police "discovered four tablets of Adderall in his sock". He was originally charged with trafficking a controlled substance in a jail, however, he later pleaded guilty to the lesser charge of possessing drug paraphernalia in violation of Kansas state law.

The United States government attempted to deport Mellouli under the Immigration and Nationality Act which has a provision that if an alien "relating to a controlled substance" as defined by the Controlled Substances Act, are deportable.

Case history 
Both in immigration court and when in front of the Board of Immigration Appeals, Mellouli argued that as his conviction did not specify a controlled substance in the Controlled Substances Act, he cannot be deported. These judicial bodies rejected that argument, stating the specific substance is irrelevant to whether Mellouli can be deported.

The Eight Circuit appellate court ruled that the BIA judgement was "reasonable" given the language of the statute.

Ruling 
The case was originally brought against Attorney General Eric Holder, however, Loretta Lynch had taken over the Department of Justice at the time of the ruling, hence the case is cited as Mellouli v. Lynch. The DoJ was represented by Rachel Kovner.

Justice Ruth Bader Ginsburg gave the majority opinion, arguing that as the conviction for possession of drug paraphernalia under Kansas state law did not require proof Mellouli that his offence 'related to' a federal controlled substance, he could not be deported.

Justice Thomas and Justice Alito dissented.

References 

2015 in United States case law
United States Supreme Court cases
United States Supreme Court cases of the Roberts Court
United States immigration and naturalization case law
Deportation from the United States
United States controlled substances case law
Adderall